The Yankee Headframe is a mine headframe near Eureka, Utah that was listed on the National Register of Historic Places in 1979.

The Yankee Consolidated mine was part of the Tintic Mining District in the 1890s, in which Jesse Knight achieved riches. It was later owned by Anaconda Copper.

References

Industrial buildings and structures on the National Register of Historic Places in Utah
Mines in Utah
National Register of Historic Places in Utah County, Utah
Anaconda Copper